GAC Pindar is a professional sailing team that competes in a variety of sailing competitions including the Extreme Sailing Series, M32's and the World Match Racing Tour.

GAC Pindar was established in 2011 and is headquartered in Southampton.

Extreme Sailing Series 
GAC Pindar has been competing in the Extreme Sailing Series since 2011, and came 5th in 2012, 6th in 2013 and 11th in 2014.

References

External links 
 

Extreme Sailing Series teams
Sports clubs established in 2011
2011 establishments in England